A Few Best Men: Original Motion Picture Soundtrack and Remixes is the sixth soundtrack album by British-Australian singer Olivia Newton-John, released on 20 January 2012 by Universal Records in Australia. It was released to promote and accompany the 2011 Australian comedy film, A Few Best Men.

The soundtrack basically consists on old pop hits sung by Newton-John and remixed by producers like Chew Fu, Roulette and Archie. The film's director, Stephan Elliott, invited Newton-John in person for the project, and also work as music producer. Some tracks are performed by session musicians credited as "The Wedding Band". Newton-John also recorded a new original track from the soundtrack, "Weightless" (written by her long-time collaborator, John Farrar, and his son, Max).

The lead single is a cover of Toni Basil's "Mickey", released to radio 9 January 2012. A music video was released, without Newton-John appearing. The song "Weightless" also has a music video that was made with clips from the film.

Background and development

In August 2011, the blog The Randy Report published a notice that Newton-John was producing a dance track with John Farrar and Marius de Vries. This confirmed the rumors that she was doing a dance album, which later proved to be the soundtrack of his new film, A Few Best Men.

The film's director and soundtrack producer, Stephan Elliott, told that his goal is to bring the famous voice of Newton-John together with sharp edged 21st century music style, creating a winning mix. His long-time collaborator, the music composer Guy Gross, produced the songs performed by The Wedding Band and wrote a new original track, "Wankered". Newton-John songs are produced by several well-known remixers. Elliott also co-produced every track of the album. About the first single, Newton-John comments: "For 'Mickey', my sister Rona and I sang the chorus together and, I never realized how cheeky the words were until I read them! My vocal coach, Steve Real, kept my voice alive that day and also added his beautiful voice to the background vocals. The genius remixers worked magic!"

The only Newton-John soundtrack track to actually appear in the film is "Weightless", which is featured in the closing credits. All other songs featured are performed by "The Wedding Band", which includes its soundtrack songs, all the covers performed by Newton-John on the soundtrack album and the unreleased songs "The Ballroom Blitz", "Skippy", "Howzat!", "Falling in Love Again", "Rock and Roll (Part I & II)", "Freeze Frame", "I'm Walking", "The Chicken Dance", "The Twist", "Y.M.C.A." and "Some Girls". The score was composed by Gross and also was not fully commercially released but received an indication for the AACTA Award for Best Original Music Score in 2013.

Promotion

The promotion of the film and the soundtrack included the participation of Newton-John in several Australian television shows such as The Project and The Circle.

A medley named "A Few from A Few Best Men" (Mirror Ball remix) with the songs "Mickey", "Weightless" and "I Think I Love You" was made for the promotion of songs at dance clubs and video ads. Newton-John sang another medley with the songs "Daydream Believer" and "Weighless" at her performance in 2012 AACTA Awards on 31 January at the Sydney Opera House.

A Summer Night with Olivia Newton-John

A Summer Night with Olivia Newton-John to promote A Few Best Men soundtrack is the eighteenth worldwide concert tour by Newton-John. The tour first leg began in February 2012, in Australia. Newton-John also performed in Asia, North America and Europe, making this tour her largest since the Heartstrings World Tour, which was finished in 2005.

A medley featuring the songs "Mickey", "Daydream Believer", "I Think I Love You" and "Sugar, Sugar" was added to the setlist for some legs. "Weightless" also was added, performed after the medley. Newton-John performed "Weightless" for the first time on her 2011 United States Tour.

Critical reception

Cameron Adams of Herald Sun gave the soundtrack a negative review, criticizing the album production. About the song "Daydream Believer", Adams says the remixer Pablo Calamari puts Newton-John's vocal in a sonic blender, "turning her into a drowning robot". While some songs like "Georgy Girl" and "Two Out of Three Ain't Bad" have not been criticized, he questions "why does half this record try to turn her into LMFAO?".

Allmusic's Jon O'Brien did a mixed review, also criticizing the auto-tuned production and the vocal performances of "The Wedding Band" musicians. He ends: "Newton-John would have perhaps been better off saving the best songs for a new studio album rather than frittering them away on a mixed bag of a soundtrack which makes the fatal mistake of being more fun to record than to listen to".

Track listing

A^ Tracks performed by "The Wedding Band".

Credits and personnel

Archie – producer, remix
Jeff Barry – songwriter, instrumentation
Steeve Body – mixing
Andy Bradfield – mixing
Eddie Brigati – songwriter, instrumentation
Pablo Calamari – producer
Felix Cavaliere – songwriter, instrumentation
Mike Chapman – songwriter
Nicky Chinn – songwriter
Jim Dale – songwriter, instrumentation
Bill Danoff – songwriter
Debaser – booklet art
Steven Duboff – songwriter
Stephan Elliott – producer, production coordinator
Warren Fahey – production coordinator
John Farrar – songwriter, instrumentation
Max Farrar – songwriter, instrumentation
Jason Fernandez – sound engineer
Lo Five – producer, additional producer
Charles Fox – songwriter, instrumentation
Chew Fu – producer, mixing, instruments, programming
Quentin Gilkey – sound engineer
Guy Gross – producer, songwriter, instrumentation
Joe Helson – additional producer, additional programming
Evan Jones – songwriter
Idris Jones – songwriter
Andy Kim – songwriter, instrumentation
Arthur Kornfeld – songwriter
Greg Macainsh – songwriter
Laurence Malkin – executive producer
Tony Mott – photography
Martin Murphy – songwriter
Olivia Newton-John – vocals
PVH – producer, mixing, instruments, programming
Steve Real – vocal coach
Tony Romeo – songwriter
Roulette – producer
Melanie Safka – songwriter
Alexis Smith – additional producer, additional programming
Greedy Smith – songwriter
Tom Springfield – songwriter, instrumentation
Jim Steinman – songwriter, instrumentation
John C. Stewart – songwriter
Marius de Vries – producer
The Wedding Band – vocals
Paul Williams – songwriter, instrumentation
Darren Ziesing – mastering engineer

Credits adapted from the album's liner notes.

Release history

References

Comedy film soundtracks
Olivia Newton-John soundtracks
2012 soundtrack albums
Universal Records soundtracks